Hokstad is a small village and ferry quay on the island of Ytterøya in the municipality of Levanger in Trøndelag county, Norway. The Levanger–Hokstad Ferry connects Hokstad on the island to the town of Levanger on the mainland.  Ytterøy Church lies just to the north of the village.

References

Villages in Trøndelag
Levanger
Ferry quays in Trøndelag